This is a list of airports in Belize, sorted by location.



Public Airports

Private and Agricultural Aerodromes

Abandoned Aerodromes

References 

 
 
  – includes IATA codes
  – IATA and ICAO codes
Aerodromes in Belize - pdf

See also 
 Transport in Belize
 List of airports by ICAO code: M#MZ - Belize
 Wikipedia: WikiProject Aviation/Airline destination lists: North America#Belize

 
Belize
Airports
Airports
Belize